The European Brain and Behaviour Society (EBBS) is a scientific society founded in 1968 whose stated purpose is the exchange of information between European scientists interested in the relationships between brain mechanisms and behaviour. It is the oldest neuroscience society in Europe. Notable past presidents include Lawrence Weiskrantz, Giacomo Rizzolatti, Marc Jeannerod, John Aggleton, Barry Everitt, Susan Sara, Carmen Sandi and Francesca Cirulli; the current president is Igor Branchi. The EBBS is a founding member of the Federation of European Neuroscience Societies. In years that there are no federation meetings, EBBS organises a stand-alone meeting.

Past and current presidents
The following persons have been presidents of EBBS:

References

External links

Behavioral neuroscience
Neuroscience organizations
1968 establishments in Europe